Sigmops is a genus of bristlemouths.

Species
There are currently four recognized species in this genus:
 Sigmops bathyphilum (Vaillant, 1884) (Spark anglemouth)
 Sigmops ebelingi (Grey, 1960) (Ebeling's fangjaw)
 Sigmops gracilis (Günther, 1878) (Slender fangjaw)
 Sigmops longipinnis (Mukhacheva, 1972)

References

Gonostomatidae
Marine fish genera
Taxa named by Theodore Gill